Richard Rouse III is an American video game designer best known as the designer of The Suffering (2004) and the author of Game Design: Theory & Practice.

Career
Rouse produced two Macintosh games, fantasy RPG Odyssey: The Legend of Nemesis (1996) and the military first-person shooter Damage Incorporated (1997). They used the technology of Bungie's Minotaur and Marathon 2.

Rouse went on to work at Leaping Lizard Software where he was lead designer on the 1998 3D remake of Centipede. From there he moved to Surreal Software where he was lead designer and writer on the action horror game The Suffering and creative director and writer on its sequel, The Suffering: Ties That Bind. In October 2005 he became the Director of Game Design at Midway.

Rouse wrote the book Game Design: Theory & Practice, first released in 2001 and revised in 2004.

Rouse was one of four creative leads working on Tom Clancy's Rainbow 6: Patriots for Ubisoft Montreal that were removed from the project in March 2012.

Projects worked on
Odyssey: The Legend of Nemesis (1996)
Damage Incorporated (1997)Centipede (1998)The Suffering (2004)The Suffering: Ties That Bind (2005)The Church in the Darkness (2019)

BooksGame Design: Theory and Practice'' (2001, 2004)

References

External links

Paranoid Productions
2005 Interview on IGN

Year of birth missing (living people)
Living people
American video game designers
University of Chicago alumni
Place of birth missing (living people)